John E. Courson (born November 21, 1944) is a former American politician. He served as a Republican member of the South Carolina Senate, representing the 20th District from 1985 to 2018. He resigned after pleading guilty to a common law misconduct charge in office.

Early life and education

John Courson was born on November 21, 1944 and graduated from the University of South Carolina in 1968.

Career

He has served as a Republican state senator for South Carolina from 1985 to 2018. In 1998, he ran for Comptroller General of South Carolina, but lost to Jim Lander.

He was elected President Pro Tempore of the South Carolina Senate on March 13, 2012, but resigned this office on June 4, 2014 to avoid becoming Lieutenant Governor, a weak position that needed to be filled for six months before a new Lieutenant Governor was elected in 2014.

In March 2017, Courson was indicted on ethics charges for mishandling campaign funds and subsequently suspended from office. He resigned June 4, 2018 after pleading guilty to such charges.

Personal life
He is married to Elizabeth Poinsett Exum, and they have three children: James Poinsett, Elizabeth Boykin, and Harris Russell. He is Episcopalian.

References

External links

Project Vote Smart - Senator John E. Courson (SC)  profile
Follow the Money - John E. Courson
2006 2004 2002 2000 1998 1996 campaign contributions

1944 births
Living people
University of South Carolina alumni
Republican Party South Carolina state senators
Politicians from Columbia, South Carolina
21st-century American politicians
South Carolina politicians convicted of crimes